The 2023 Sacrifice is an upcoming professional wrestling event produced by Impact Wrestling. The event will take place on March 24, 2023, at the St. Clair College in Windsor, Ontario, Canada, and would air on Impact Plus. It will be the 14th event under the Sacrifice chronology. It would also be Impact's first show in Canada since 2019.

Production

Background 
Sacrifice was an annual professional wrestling pay-per-view (PPV) event produced by Impact Wrestling (then known as Total Nonstop Action Wrestling (TNA)) that was first held in August 2005. The promotion's PPV schedule was reduced to four quarterly events in 2013, dropping Sacrifice. The event would return in 2014 and in 2016, the latter as a special edition of Impact!. The event would be revived in 2020 as a monthly special for Impact Plus.

On October 25, 2022, Impact Wrestling announced that Sacrifice will take place on Friday, March 24, 2023, at the St. Clair College in Windsor, Ontario, Canada.

Storylines 
The event will feature several professional wrestling matches that involve different wrestlers from pre-existing scripted feuds and storylines. Wrestlers will portray villains, heroes, or less distinguishable characters in scripted events that build tension and culminate in a wrestling match or series of matches. Storylines are produced on Impact's weekly television program.

At Hard To Kill, Mickie James defeated Jordynne Grace to win the Impact Knockouts World Championship in a Title vs. Career match. Although, during the match, Grace had James in a rear-naked choke and it seemed as though James tapped out, but the referee waived it off. On the March 9 episode of Impact!, after James successfully defended the title against Gisele Shaw, Impact announced that Grace will invoke her rematch clause and challenge James at Sacrifice.

After Bully Ray turned on Impact World Champion Josh Alexander at the end of Over Drive the previous November, Ray would enter a feud with former friend Tommy Dreamer. For the next few months, Dreamer would remark about Ray constantly alienating himself from the locker room in order to achieve his goals, while Ray spat back about how he was always more popular than Dreamer in every promotion they have worked for together. The tension was so much that both wanted the other out of Impact Wrestling. At No Surrender, Dreamer and Ray would be part of a live edition of their podcast "Busted Open Radio" to air their grievances, with show host Dave LaGreca presiding as mediator. By the end of the segment, the animosity seemed to have cooled down between the two, until Ray threw coffee in Dreamer's face before smashing a coffee pot over his head. In a video posted on Impact's social media platforms, Dreamer would challenge Ray to a Busted Open match, where the winner would be the one who makes their opponent bleed, which was made official for Sacrifice.

On the Countdown to No Surrender pre-show, Gisele Shaw defeated Deonna Purrazzo due to interference from her stylist Jai Vidal and new bodyguard Savannah Evans. Two weeks later, on the March 9 episode of Impact!, while Shaw challenged Mickie James for the Knockouts World Championship, Purrazzo, who was on commentary for the match, neutralized Vidal and assisted James in getting the pin on Shaw. On March 14, Impact announced that a rematch between Purrazzo and Shaw was made official for Sacrifice.

On the November 10, 2022 episode of Impact!, Joe Hendry defeated Brian Myers to win the Impact Digital Media Championship. Since then, Hendry would be embroiled with feuds against Moose and The Major Players (Myers and Matt Cardona) over the title, though Myers had yet to get his rematch. On the March 9, 2023 episode of Impact!, Myers and Moose would attack Hendry backstage, with Myers claiming the Digital Media Championship belonged to him. The following week, Hendry confronted Impact Director of Authority Santino Marella about invoking Myers' rematch clause for him, and Marella made a title match between the two official for Sacrifice.

On the October 20, 2022 episode of Impact!, Eddie Edwards returned after failing to win the Impact World Championship at Bound for Glory. He would bring together his stable Honor No More (Matt Taven, Mike Bennett, Kenny King, PCO, and Vincent) and ask if they truly believe in their group. He would specifically single out PCO, who's loyalty he'd been questioning since Slammiversary, until the latter snapped and attacked every single member of Honor No More. Honor No More would disband not long after. Two weeks later, PCO and Edwards brawled in the Great Basin Desert, which saw Edwards bury PCO under the sand. Two months later, at Hard To Kill, after Edwards defeated Jonathan Gresham, PCO returned and attacked Edwards with the shovel he was buried with. Their feud would continue to the March 9 episode of Impact!, where the two would again brawl in the desert, where it looked as if PCO would now bury Edwards until the former was run over by a car. The following week, Edwards called out PCO in an in-ring promo, which PCO answered but was jumped on the ramp by former stablemate Kenny King. With King now seemingly the prime suspect as the driver, a match between PCO and King was made official for Sacrifice.

Matches

References

External links 
 

2023 Impact Plus Monthly Special events
2023 in Ontario
2023 in professional wrestling
Events in Ontario
Impact Wrestling Sacrifice
March 2023 events in Canada
Professional wrestling in Ontario
Scheduled professional wrestling shows